Killure is the name of several places in Ireland:

Killure, County Waterford, a townland in the Republic of Ireland near Waterford Airport
Killure, County Kilkenny, near Goresbridge in the Republic of Ireland
Killure, County Londonderry in Northern Ireland